Treehouse Trolls Birthday Day (1992) is a live action children's musical created for home video, written by G.G. Smith.  Produced and directed by Ernest Schultz, executive producer was Christopher A. Cohen, son of Broadway producer, Alexander H. Cohen. Choreographer was Lawrence Leritz, costumes by Tony winning designer, Alvin Colt.  Cast included Steven Boldis, Andi Henig, Danielle McGovern, Danny Rutigliano and Lawrence Leritz as Donald The Donkey.
Released by Goodtimes Entertainment Video.

Songs
"The Birthday Song"
"We're So Happy"
"The Donkey Song"
"Bluebird On My Window"
"The Leapfrog Song"

See also
Treehouse Trolls Forest of Fun and Wonder

References
IMDb
IMDb

Children's music
Dam dolls